Indo-Guyanese or Indian-Guyanese, are people of Indian origin who are Guyanese nationals tracing their ancestry to India and the wider subcontinent. They are the descendants of indentured servants and settlers who migrated from India beginning in 1838 during the time of the British Raj.

Most of the Indian settlers who arrived to then British Guiana were from North India, specifically the Bhojpur and the Awadh region of the Hindi Belt. However a significant minority came from South India through the port of Madras. Among the immigrants, there were also labourers from other parts of South Asia. The vast majority of Indians came as contract labourers during the 19th century, spurred on by political upheaval, the ramifications of the Mutiny of 1857 and famine. Others arrived as merchants, landowners and farmers pushed out by many of the same factors.

Indo-Guyanese are the largest ethnic group in Guyana identified by the official census, about 40% of the population in 2012. There is also a large Indo-Guyanese diaspora in countries such as the United States, Canada and the United Kingdom.

History
Indian immigration to the British West Indies was triggered by Great Britain's decision in the 1830s to outlaw the enslavement of labour brought from Africa. Newly emancipated Africans were suddenly able to choose where to live and what to do, which led sugar plantation owners to look elsewhere. After recruiting from other countries, colonial recruitment turned to British India.

The indentured labour system became the replacement system for slavery in British Guiana. Persisting for 75 years, this system of indentured servitude presented its own forms of injustices, creating conflict with Indian nationalists, who finally pushed for its cessation in 1917. One major distinction between slavery and the indentured immigrant experience was that the indentured labourers from India had agreed to immigration, signing contracts that bound them to a plantation for five years, while earning a small, fixed daily wage. After five additional years working in Guiana (for a total of 10 years), they would then be entitled to either receive passage back to India or to stay in Guiana and receive land and money to start their own businesses.

396 Indian immigrants arrived from Calcutta in 1838, but a reported total of over 230,000 indentured labourers arrived from India over the ensuing 80 years.

For its first 25 years, indentured recruits were drawn largely from small towns in and around Calcutta, but people were recruited from as far as Sri Lanka. Other groups of recruits spoke the Tamil and Telugu of South India.

The backbone of all recruiting operations were professional recruiters, assisted by paid local agents called "Arkatis" in North India and "Maistris" in South India. Intimidation, coercion, and deception were common, as were illegal practices, such as kidnapping and forced detention. An example of deception related to labourers who signed to immigrate to Surinam; recruiters would pronounce the country as "Sri-Ram," which then would become the names of two Hindu deities with complex but very positive connotations.

In addition to having to deal with lack of freedoms, intense heat, and brutal working conditions, these indentured servants were largely met with hostility from the newly-freed African population, whose opportunity to earn a living was undercut by the very low wages paid to the Indian immigrants.

Monuments

On 5 May 1988, a bronze sculpture of the Whitby who brought the first labourers to British Guiana was presented to the people of Guyana by the Indian government. It is located in the Guyana National Park in Georgetown.

On 5 May 2019, the Indian Immigration Monument was unveiled by president David A. Granger. It is located in Palmyra near the Berbice Bridge. The compound near the monument has a visitor's gallery, several fountains and a playground.

Culture
Indian settlers retained their traditions. But the process of cultural adaptation has made the culture of the modern Indo-Guyanese more Westernized, than that of their immigrant ancestors.

Cultural origins and religion

Between 1838 and 1917 over 500 ship voyages with 238,960 indentured Indian immigrants came to Guyana; while just 75,236 of them or their children returned. The vast majority came from the north or north-central regions of India with a wide range of castes represented.

The most popular dialect spoken was Bhojpuri (spoken in east Uttar Pradesh and west Bihar), followed by Awadhi (spoken in central Uttar Pradesh). 52% of the immigrants came from districts that are now part of the Indian states of Uttar Pradesh, Uttarakhand or Punjab; 23% from districts that are now part of Bihar and Jharkhand state; 6% were from pre-partitioned Bengal; 8% from what is today Tamil Nadu state (through Chennai); 6% from Western India Maharastra, Gujarat, Rajasthan (through Bombay); 3 percent of what is Central India; 1 percent of what is Odisha and the remaining 1% from the rest of India.
(85.8% of all the Indian Immigrants to Guyana left the port of Calcutta in eastern India, 8.2% from the port of Madras in southern India), and 6% from Western India.

The majority of immigrants came from lower agricultural castes; artisan castes; cultivator castes (kurmi); grazier castes (ahir); landholding castes (thakur), and priestly castes (brahmin). There were also significant numbers of Muslims and outcasts.

The Indian immigrants made an enduring cultural imprint on Guyana. Since the Indians came from functioning societies and economies in their homeland, once their labor contracts expired they were able to resume their original occupations and recreate near-typical traditional Indian village life in their adopted homeland.

Festivals and holidays

Indo-Guyanese Hindus continue to observe holidays such as Diwali, Phagwah, Maha Shivratri, Hanuman Jayanti, Ram Navami, Navratri, Vijayadashami, Krishna Janmashtami, Radhastami, Saraswati Jayanti, Raksha Bandhan, Guru Purnima, Ganesh Chaturthi, Kalbhairo Jayanti, Kartik Snan, Vivaha Panchami, Mesha Sankranti, Makar Sankranti, Tulsi Vivah, and Gita Jayanti among others, while Indo-Guyanese Muslims observe the fast in the month of Ramadan as well as observing Eid ul-Fitr, Eid al-Adha, Hosay, Shab-e-barat, Mawlid, and the Islamic New Year. Indo-Guyanese Christians celebrate holidays such as New Year's, Christmas, Easter, All Saints' Day and the Feast of Corpus Christi, among others and depending on their denomination. Through colonial influence, celebrating holidays such as Diwali, Phagwah, Eid ul-Fitr, Hosay, New Year's, Christmas, and Easter, is common regardless of religious beliefs. In Guyana, Indian Arrival Day is celebrated on May 5 commemorating the first arrival of indentured servants from India to the country, on 5 May 1838. On this day, the workers arrived to work in sugar plantations. Indo-Guyanese also celebrate Guyanese national holidays such as Independence Day and Republic Day.

Marriage

There is no "preferential marriages between kin" among Indo-Guyanese, nor much significance tied to marriage outside of ones religion or caste compared to other Indian diasporic groups. The duty of parents to provide the wedding for their children demonstrated "respectability and prestige" and while children generally had some say in who they married, they looked to their parents to "arrange for the rituals and meet the necessary expenses." The wedding of the first child is generally the largest and most opulent, becoming reduced and more economized for subsequent children. Parents may exaggerate the expenses put into these weddings, which are mainly on "clothes, food and drink", and dowry depending on the family and era. Weddings are qualified by the number of people fed, and a basic meal of roti, rice and a vegetable curry is considered the bare minimum.

Among Hindus and Muslims, arranged, comparatively early marriages were common in rural areas until the modern period (early 1960s) but are rare now. Middle-class Indians had greater freedom in choosing a spouse, especially if the woman was a professional. As in most parts of the western world marriage now occurs later, and the family unit is smaller than in the past. Indo Guyanese families are patriarchal with an extended system, where family members assist each other, like many other groups in Guyana. For individuals who are Hindu, wedding ceremonies are now performed with the bride and groom dressed in traditional Indian clothing, as an expression of their culture. If it can be afforded there is usually a Hindu wedding ceremony and also a western or "regular" wedding reception, or a small Hindu ceremony and a much larger "reception" so friends from the larger community can attend.

Cuisine
With the blending of cultures in the Caribbean, Indo-Caribbean dishes became one of the dominant notes throughout most of the English Caribbean, with dishes such as curry, roti and dhal bhat (dhal and rice). Indo-Guyanese snacks include sal sev (also called chicken foot due to appearance, although there is no actual meat in it), gantia, plantain chips, roasted nuts, and fried channa. Appetizers and street foods include boil and fried or curried channa as well as bara, wrap roti, pholourie, and potato or cassava/egg ball which are served with a chutney or sour. The rotis that Indo-Guyanese typically eat are paratha, dhalpuri, sada roti, dosti roti, aloo roti, and puri. Murgatani (multani) and rasam are popular soups in Guyana of South Indian origin. Dosa (dosay or chota) is a filled crepe that is eaten by Indo-Guyanese and is of South Indian origin as well.

The main dishes at Hindu wedding, festivals, and prayer services are known as seven curry and consist of seven vegetarian curries: aloo and channa curry, eddoes (aruwi) curry, mango curry, baigan/balanjay curry, katahar curry, pumpkin or kohra (fried or curried), and bhaji (made with young malabar spinach, moringa, spinach or spiny amaranth leaves) served with dhal bhat (dhal and rice) or karhi and rice. Seven curry is also served with paratha or dhalpuri roti. Individual curries of seven curry are also consumed on a daily basis by Indo-Guyanese as a main dish. Meat and seafood based main dishes include chicken, duck, goat, lamb, fish (especially hassa, gilbaka, banga mary, butterfish, houri, haimara, cuffum,  cuirass, lukanani, patwa, pakoo, red snapper, as well as tinned salmon, tuna, and sardine), shrimp, crab, lobster, pork (except Muslims and some Hindus) and beef (except Hindus) curry or bunjal (a type of dried curry). Fried chicken, fish, and shrimp are also eaten as a main dish along with dhal and rice. Khichri is also a popular quick dish that was seen as a staple in the days of indentureship. In Guyana, among the Indo-Guyanese people, it is popular to eat curried or fried vegetables such as okra, eddoe, breadnut, lablab beans, pumpkin, bitter melon, drumstick, long beans, calabash, potato, chickpeas, and eggplant. Roti or dhal bhat is always served along with any curry or fried dish.

Chokhas are also a popular breakfast and lunch dish among the Indo-Guyanese and prepared by roasting vegetables that are skinned after roasting, and then garlic, onions, and peppers are chaunkay-ed or tempered in oil and added to the mashed roasted vegetable and salt is added after. Popular chokhas include baigan/balanjay (eggplant), tomatoes, and coconut. Chokhas are  usually served with sada roti. Fish and shrimp are also used to make chokha.

Desserts include gulab jamun, mohanbhog (parsad), gurma (gurumba), ladoo, mithai, jalebi, gulgula, doodhpitty, barfi, pera, gujiya (goja), sirnie, vermicelli (sawine), and kheer (sweet rice).

Indo-Guyanese have also adopted other dishes from other cultural groups such as stews, pepperpot, ground provisions, bake and saltfish, sardines and bread, fried chicken, metemgee, chicken soup, cook-up rice, chow mein, lo mein, fried rice, pepper shrimp, and chicken in de' ruff. Guyanese breads, pastries, cakes, and frozen treats are also popular among Indo-Guyanese, such as patties, pine tart, butterflap, tennis roll, fried bake, cassava bread, plait bread, cheese roll, black bean (chiney) cake, cassava or pumpkin pone, salara, coconut drops, black cake, lime cookies, custard, fudge, snow cone, ice cream, and custard block (ice block).

Entertainment

Bollywood movies and songs have had an impact upon the Guyanese pop culture since the early 1950s. Many Bollywood stars have visited and performed in Guyana like megastars Shah Rukh Khan, Juhi Chawla, and Preity Zinta, also very popular singers such as Sonu Nigam, Asha Bhosle, Alka Yagnik, Shreya Ghoshal, Udit Narayan, Sunidhi Chauhan, Kumar Sanu, Hari Om Sharan, and Anup Jalota have had very successful shows in Guyana. In 1980, Lata Mangeshkar was greeted with crowds of fans and was presented with the key of the city of Georgetown, Guyana on her visit. Indian soap operas and dance and music shows have recently grown in popularity in Guyana due to channels such as Zee TV, StarPlus, Sony Entertainment Television, and Colors TV. The most popular genres of music among Indo-Guyanese people include chutney, chutney soca, baithak gana, bhajan, Bollywood, Indian classical music, Indian folk music, and soca. Popular local Indo-Caribbean singers include Sundar Popo, Terry Gajraj, Ramdew Chaitoe, Dropati, Ravi Bissambhar, Rakesh Yankaran, Rikki Jai, Drupatee Ramgoonai, and Babla & Kanchan. Indian instrumental influence can be seen in Guyana through the use of the tabla, harmonium, dholak, dhantal, manjira, khartal, and tassa drums.

Literature 
Indo-Guyanese literature includes novels, poetry, plays and other forms written by people born or strongly-affiliated with Guyana, who are descendants of indentured Indian servants. As a former British colony, English language and style had an enduring impact on the writings from Guyana, which are done in English language and utilizing Guyanese Creole. Notable writers include Joseph Ruhomon and Shana Yardan.

Notable Indo-Guyanese

Return to India
Ever since India gained its independence, many labourers of Indian origin in British Guiana and other Caribbean colonies like Trinidad and Tobago and Jamaica wanted to be returned to India with their visions tinted with the ideal of being part of a newly independent Indian republic, even those who had lived in the Caribbean for over 60 years and had grandchildren. Only the government in British Guiana acquiesced and chartered a ship to bring the returnees back to India.

On September 4, 1955, about 243 passengers boarded the M.V. Resurgent and left Georgetown for Calcutta. Since their arrival in India, many felt that it was a mistake to return as India has changed drastically since they left and many could not afford the journey back to the colonies. Those who could however went back to British Guiana or moved to other British colonies such as Trinidad and Tobago, Mauritius, Fiji, Malta and other British Caribbean territories.

The Indo-Guyanese who remained in India settled in villages and in cities like Prayagraj, Varanasi, Lucknow, Kanpur, Basti, Gorakhpur, Azamgarh, Ballia, Chhapra, Faizabad, Patna, Chennai and Kolkata. In addition, many Indo-Guyanese Hindus returned to India due to the spiritual importance of the Ganges River and other Hindu pilgrimage sites at the later stages of their lives.

See also 

 Guyana–India relations
 Indian indenture system
 Indo-Caribbean
 Hinduism in Guyana
 British Indo-Caribbean community
 Indo-Caribbean Americans
 Non-resident Indian and person of Indian origin

References

Further reading
 Roopnarine, Lomarsh. "Indian social identity in Guyana, Trinidad, and the North American diaspora." Wadabagei: A Journal of the Caribbean and its Diaspora 12.3 (2009): 87+.
 Sen, Sunanda. "Indentured Labour from India in the Age of Empire." Social Scientist 44.1/2 (2016): 35-74. online

 
Guyanese
Ethnic groups in Guyana
Indo-Caribbean